Tengku Muhammad Fa-iz Petra ibni Almarhum Sultan Ismail Petra (born 20 January 1974) is the current Tengku Mahkota (Crown Prince) of the Malaysian state of Kelantan, heir presumptive and first in line of succession to the throne of Kelantan. He was proclaimed as the Crown Prince of Kelantan on 18 October 2010 upon the accession of his elder brother, Sultan Muhammad V as the 29th Sultan of Kelantan.

He is the second of four children of the late Sultan of Kelantan, Sultan Ismail Petra and Raja Perempuan Tengku Anis. His two younger siblings are Tengku Muhammad Fakhry Petra and Tengku Amalin A’ishah Putri. His eldest brother is the Sultan of Kelantan, Sultan Muhammad V, the fifteenth Yang di-Pertuan Agong of Malaysia.

Biography 

Tengku Fa-iz was born in Kota Bharu, Kelantan on 20 January 1974. He was appointed Tengku Bendahara of Kelantan on 30 March 1989 and was the President of the Kelantan Islamic Religious and Malay Customs Council (MAIK) from 21 June 2009 to 18 March 2019.

He received his complete education as follows:
 SK Sultan Ismail (1), Kota Bharu, Kelantan
 Alice Smith School, Kuala Lumpur
 Oakham School, Rutland, England, United Kingdom - 10A GCSE and 3A A-Level
 London School of Economics and Political Science, United Kingdom - BA History
 Università degli Studi di Firenze, Florence, Italy - Italian Language and Literature (Beginner and Intermediate)
 Institute of Classical Studies, University College London, United Kingdom - MA Ancient History and MPhil/PhD History (2010)

His PhD dissertation is about the transition between late antiquity and the early medieval period in north Etruria (400-900 AD).

Tengku Fa-iz was elevated to the position of Tengku Mahkota or heir presumptive to the throne of Kelantan upon deliberation of the Kelantan State Council of Succession which was chaired by Tengku Laksamana Kelantan Tengku Abdul Halim Ibni Almarhum Sultan Ibrahim. The ceremony to present the letter of appointment as Tengku Mahkota Kelantan was held at Istana Negeri in Kubang Kerian on 18 October 2010.

According to the Kelantan State Constitution, Tengku Fa-iz could be the ruler or regent when the Sultan is abroad for a period of more than 12 months or unable to carry out his duties as the ruler over the same period.

He was conferred to the rank of First Admiral (Honorary) of the Royal Malaysian Navy (RMN) on 5 April 2013.

On 8 December 2016, Tengku Fa-iz was appointed as the Pemangku Raja (Regent) of Kelantan, following the appointment of his eldest brother, Sultan Muhammad V as the fifteenth Yang di-Pertuan Agong of Malaysia on 13 December 2016.

Tengku Fa-iz was the Chancellor of the Universiti Malaysia Kelantan (UMK) from 16 February 2017 until 22 November 2022.

Tengku Fa-iz is a Pro-Chancellor of the Universiti Malaysia Kelantan, and was appointed on 23 November 2022, after his brother, Sultan Muhammad V proclaimed as the new Chancellor of the Universiti Malaysia Kelantan.

Marriage 
On 19 April 2019, Tengku Fa-iz married Swedish citizen, Her Highness Che Puan Sofie Louise Johansson Petra, the Che Puan Mahkota of Kelantan (born 1986) at Istana Balai Besar in Kota Bharu. They met in London where Tengku Fa-iz was a student and Johansson also studied and worked. For wedding presents the royal couple wished for donations to aid organisations in Kelantan. The solemnisation ceremony was performed by Dato’ Aria D’Raja cum Kelantan Syariah Court Chief Judge Dato' Daud Mohamad and were witnessed by the Tengku Laksamana of Kelantan Tengku Abdul Halim and Member of Parliament for Gua Musang Tengku Razaleigh Hamzah.

Honours 
He has been awarded:

Honours of Kelantan 
  Recipient of the Royal Family Order of Kelantan or Star of Yunus (DK) (30 March 2003)
  Knight Grand Commander of the Order of the Crown of Kelantan or Star of Muhammad (SPMK) – Dato'
  Silver Jubilee Medal (30 March 2004)

Honours of Kedah 
  The Most Esteemed Supreme Order of Sri Mahawangsa (DMK) - Dato' Seri Utama (30 September 2017)

Ancestry

Note

References
 Tengku Muhammad Faiz is Kelantan crown prince, The Star, 18 October 2010.

External links

People from Kota Bharu
People from Kelantan
Malaysian people of Malay descent
Living people
Malaysian Muslims
Royal House of Kelantan
1974 births
Members of the Supreme Order of Sri Mahawangsa
Sons of monarchs